Daša Grm (born 18 April 1991) is a Slovenian figure skater. She is a two-time Dragon Trophy champion (2012, 2016), the 2015 Hellmut Seibt Memorial champion, the 2017 Ice Challenge champion, a two-time Golden Bear of Zagreb silver medalist (2013, 2017), and a seven-time Slovenia national champion (2014–2020). She has competed in the final segment at eight ISU Championships, including four World Championships (2015, 2018, 2019, 2022).

Personal life
Daša Grm was born on 18 April 1991 in Celje, Slovenia. She studied kinesiology at university and graduated with a bachelor's degree. Her father, Stanislav Grm, is a former ski jumper.

Career
Grm appeared on the novice level until the end of the 2003–04 season. She competed at her first ISU Junior Grand Prix (JGP) event in autumn 2004. Her ISU Championship debut came in March 2006 at the World Junior Championships in Ljubljana, Slovenia. She finished 25th that year and 43rd in 2007 in Oberstdorf, Germany.

Grm made her senior international debut in November 2008 at the Golden Spin of Zagreb, finishing 15th, but continued to appear sporadically on the junior level. She ranked 46th at the 2009 World Junior Championships in Sofia, Bulgaria.

Grm made her first appearance in a senior ISU Championship in January 2011 at the European Championships in Bern, Switzerland. She qualified for the free skate and finished 20th overall. Competing in April 2011 at the World Championships in Moscow, she advanced from the preliminary round to the short program, where she was eliminated. Grm did not reach the short program at the World Championships in Nice, France. Anja Bratec coached her at the time.

Jan Čejvan became Grm's coach by 2013. In January 2014, she placed 27th in the short program at the European Championships in Budapest, Hungary; she did not qualify to the next segment. In the 2014–15 season, Grm competed at two ISU Challenger Series events, placing 12th at the Warsaw Cup and then 4th at the Golden Spin of Zagreb. In January 2015, she won a bronze medal at the Toruń Cup but was unable to reach the free skate at the European Championships, placing 30th in the short program in Stockholm, Sweden. The following month, she won gold at the Hellmut Seibt Memorial. In March 2015, she competed at the World Championships in Shanghai, China. Ranked 22nd in the short program, she qualified for the free skate, where she placed 18th, pulling her up to 18th overall.

In the 2015–16 season, Grm was invited to her first Grand Prix event, the 2015 Rostelecom Cup.

In the 2017-18 season, Grm qualified to the free skater at both Europeans and Worlds. However, she failed to qualify for the Pyeonghcang Olympics.
 
In the 2018-19 season, Grm finished a career-best 17th Place at Europeans and for the second time placed in the top 20 at Worlds. She also successfully landed a Triple-Triple combination in competition at the short program at worlds for the first time in her career.

Grm failed to qualify for the free skating at the 2021 World Figure Skating Championships, thus failing to qualify a berth for the Beijing Olympics. At the Nebelhorn Trophy later in the year, Grm qualified as the 4th Alternate for the Winter Olympics, failing to qualify for the second time. She concluded the season with a disappointing 24th place at the 2022 Worlds

Grm had a rough start to the new quad, not skating a clean SP or FS in the whole season. Grm however did manage to qualify for her fourth ISU European Championship, finishing in 21st place.

Programs

Results 
GP: Grand Prix; CS: Challenger Series; JGP: Junior Grand Prix

References

External links 

 

Slovenian female single skaters
1991 births
Living people
Sportspeople from Celje
Competitors at the 2015 Winter Universiade
Competitors at the 2013 Winter Universiade
Competitors at the 2017 Winter Universiade
Competitors at the 2011 Winter Universiade